The Norway national speedway team are motorcycle speedway national team from Norway. The most famous riders is Rune Holta, Speedway Grand Prix permanent rider. After becoming a Polish citizen, Holta currently rides for the Poland national team.

World championships

Speedway World Cup

Team U-21

European Championships

Pairs

Honours

World Championships

European Championships

See also
 Speedway Grand Prix of Norway
 motorcycle speedway

National speedway teams
Speedway
National team